Tengku Ampuan Tua Tengku Intan Zaharah binti Almarhum Tengku Seri Setia Raja Tengku Hitam Omar (Jawi: تڠكو امڤوان توا تڠكو اينتن زهرة بنت المرحوم تڠكو ستيا راج تڠکو هيتم عمر; 13 April 1928 – 24 January 2015) was the Tengku Ampuan Tua (Grand Queen Dowager) of Terengganu. She was formerly the Tengku Ampuan Besar (Queen consort) of Terengganu from 1945 to 1979, the Tengku Ampuan (Queen Dowager) of Terengganu from 1979 to 1998 and Tengku Ampuan Tua (Grand Queen Dowager) of Terengganu from 1998 until her death in 2015. She also served as the fourth Raja Permaisuri Agong of Malaysia from 1965 to 1970.

Early life
Tengku Intan was born in Singapore on 13 April 1928. Her father, Tengku Seri Setia Raja Terengganu Tengku Hitam Omar, was a member of the Singapore (Johor Bendahara Horeh) royal family, serving in the Terengganu State Civil Service as the State Secretary of Terengganu; he was exiled since the death of the last Sultan of Singapore, Alauddin Alam Shah, in 1897. Her mother was Raja Zainab binti Raja Alang (second wife of her father).

Tengku Intan received her education at the Malay School in Telok Kurau and Katong Convent, Singapore.

Royal life
Tengku Intan married Sultan Ismail Nasiruddin Shah ibni Almarhum Sultan Zainal Abidin III (then Tengku Paduka Raja of Terengganu) on 3 April 1944 as his second wife. She had no children with him.

On 5 November 1945 the Terengganu State Council of thirteen members announced the dismissal of Sultan Ali Shah and the appointment of Tengku Ismail as the fifteenth Sultan of Terengganu. Tengku Ismail became known as Sultan Ismail Nasiruddin Shah and was installed on 6 June 1949 at Istana Maziah, Kuala Terengganu.

Accordingly, Tengku Intan Zaharah became Tengku Ampuan Besar (Queen) of Terengganu. Tengku Intan served as Raja Permaisuri Agong during her husband's reign as the fourth Yang di-Pertuan Agong or King of Malaysia.

In 1979, upon her husband's death she was created Tengku Ampuan (Queen Dowager) of Terengganu. In 1998, on the death of her stepson, Sultan Mahmud Al-Muktafi Billah Shah, she became Tengku Ampuan Tua (Grand Queen Dowager) of Terengganu.

Death
Tengku Ampuan Tua Tengku Intan Zaharah died on 24 January 2015 at 3:30 pm in Hospital Pantai, Kuala Lumpur due to pneumonia. She was 86 years old. Her body was brought back to Terengganu and was laid to rest beside her husband grave, Sultan Ismail Nasiruddin Shah at the Royal Mausoleum near Abidin Mosque, Kuala Terengganu.

Awards and recognitions

National honours

Honours of Terengganu
 Member 1st Class of the Most Distinguished Family Order of Terengganu (DK)
 Member Grand Companion of the Most Revered Order of Sultan Mahmud I of Terengganu (SSMT)
 Knight Grand Commander of the Most Distinguished Order of the Crown of Terengganu (SMPT)

Honours of Malaysia
 Recipient of the Most Exalted Order of the Crown of the Realm (DMN, 6 April 1966)

Foreign honours
:
 Dame Grand Cordon of the Order of the Queen of Sheba (21 May 1968)

:
 Grand Cross Special Class of the Order of Merit of the Federal Republic of Germany (9 March 1967)

:
 First Class of the Order of Mahaputera (16 March 1970)

 Iran:
 Member 1st Class of the Order of the Pleiades (17 January 1968)

:
 Dame Grand Cross (Paulownia) of the Order of the Precious Crown (19 February 1970)

:
 First Class of the Golden Heart Medal (9 February 1968)

:
 Dame of the Grand Order of Mugunghwa (7 February 1966)
 Grand Gwanghwa Medal of the Order of Diplomatic Service Merit (7 February 1966)

Places named after her
Several places were named after her, including: 
 Jalan Tengku Ampuan Intan Zaharah (Federal Route 3685) in Kuala Nerus, Terengganu
 SMK Tengku Intan Zaharah in Dungun, Terengganu
SK Tengku Ampuan Intan in Kuala Berang, Terengganu
 SMK Tengku Ampuan Intan in Kuala Berang, Terengganu
 Tengku Ampuan Intan Zaharah Mosque in Dungun, Terengganu

See also 
Yang di-Pertuan Agong
Raja Permaisuri Agong

References

1928 births
2015 deaths
Deaths from pneumonia in Malaysia
People from Singapore
Singaporean people of Malay descent
Singaporean emigrants to Malaysia
People who lost Singaporean citizenship
Citizens of Malaysia through descent
Royal House of Terengganu
Malaysian people of Malay descent
Malaysian Muslims
Intan Zaharah
Intan Zaharah
First Classes of the Family Order of Terengganu
Members Grand Companion of the Order of Sultan Mahmud I of Terengganu
Grand Cordons of the Order of the Precious Crown
Knights Grand Commander of the Order of the Crown of Terengganu
Grand Crosses 1st class of the Order of Merit of the Federal Republic of Germany
Malaysian queens consort
Recipients of the Order of the Crown of the Realm
Recipients of orders, decorations, and medals of Ethiopia